Clarence Angier (December 12, 1853 – March 4, 1926) was an American golfer. He competed in the men's individual event at the 1904 Summer Olympics. He worked for a life insurance company for a quarter century. He died in 1926 at age 72 in Atlanta. He was described by The Atlanta Constitution as a "pioneer citizen". He was buried at West View Cemetery.

References

External links
 

1853 births
1926 deaths
Amateur golfers
American male golfers
Olympic golfers of the United States
Golfers at the 1904 Summer Olympics
Golfers from Atlanta